The 1945 Miami Redskins football team was an American football team that represented Miami University as an independent during the 1945 college football season. In its second season under head coach Sid Gillman, Miami compiled a 7–2 record and outscored all opponents by a combined total of 220 to 72. Paul Dietzel, who later served as the head football coach at LSU, Army, and South Carolina, was the team captain.

Schedule

References

Miami
Miami RedHawks football seasons
Miami Redskins football